San Francisco Fountain, is a 1970 bronze sculpture and fountain by Ruth Asawa, located outside the Grand Hyatt San Francisco in downtown San Francisco, California, in the United States.

Description and history
The cylinder-shaped sculpture, which serves as the outer wall of the fountain basin, features bas-relief scenes of San Francisco, "whimsically interrelated". Albert Lanier served as the architect; credited assistants include Aiko Asawa, Haru Awara, Mae Lee, Mei Mei, Hector Villanueva, and Sally Woodbridge.

Writing in The Journal of Modern Craft, Sue Archer described the genesis of the fountain:

(Asawa) became involved with the fountain project by chance: architect Chuck Bassett of the firm Skidmore, Owings and Merrill happened to see an exhibition at the California Redwood Association that featured sculpture by Asawa as well as work by some of the children who attended the Alvarado Elementary School. Bassett was part of the design team for the new Grand Hyatt San Francisco, and wanted to find an artist to help realize an engaging design for the fountain that was to sit just in front of the hotel's entrance. The children's work in the Redwood Association exhibition had been crafted from a substance Ruth called "baker's clay," an inedible mixture of flour, salt, and water, which could be worked like real ceramic and then "fired" in an ordinary oven. The children's works depicted scenes from daily life at Alvarado. Charmed, Bassett suggested that Asawa work with children from different parts of the city to create a large, low-relief for the fountain's exterior. The cast bronze cylinder that resulted bore the efforts of children and friends of Asawa's, including leaves fashioned by Ruth's mother, Haru Asawa.

The work was surveyed and labeled "treatment needed" by the Smithsonian Institution's Save Outdoor Sculpture! program in September 1992.

In May 2016, Apple Inc. completed construction of a new flagship store on the northwest corner of Post and Stockton Streets. The project included renovating the public space located between the new store and a hotel on the southwest corner of Sutter and Stockton Streets. The renovated public open space now includes wooden tables, chairs, planters with trees, a "living wall," a new multi-color "LOVE" sculpture and Ruth Asawa's San Francisco Fountain.  Some restoration and preservation work on the fountain was done as part of the project.

See also
 History of fountains in the United States

Further reading
 Woodridge, Sally (1973) Ruth Asawa's San Francisco Fountain. San Francisco Museum of Art.

References

1970 establishments in California
1970 sculptures
Bronze sculptures in California
Fountains in California
Outdoor sculptures in San Francisco
Union Square, San Francisco